The Yawa languages, also known as Yapen languages, are a small family of two closely related Papuan languages, Yawa (or Yava) and Saweru, which are often considered to be divergent dialects of a single language (and thus a language isolate). They are spoken on central Yapen Island and nearby islets, in Cenderawasih Bay, Indonesian Papua, which they share with the Austronesian Yapen languages.

Yawa proper had 6000 speakers in 1987. Saweru has been variously reported to be partially intelligible with other dialects of Yawa and to be considered a dialect of Yawa by its speakers, and to be too divergent for intelligibility and to be perceived as a separate language. It is moribund, spoken by 150 people out of an ethnic group of 300.

Classification
C. L. Voorhoeve tentatively linked Yawa with the East Geelvink Bay languages in his Geelvink Bay proposal. However, the relationship would be a distant one at best, and Mark Donohue felt in 2001 that Yawa had not been shown to be related to any other language. Reesink (2005) notes resemblances with East Bird's Head languages. Recently Malcolm Ross made a tentative proposal that Yawa might be part of an Extended West Papuan language phylum. The pronominal resemblances are most apparent when comparing proto-Yawa to the East Bird's Head language Meax:

{| class=wikitable
|-
!  !! I !! thou !! s/he !! you 
|-
| Proto-Yawa ||  ||  ||  || 
|-
| Meax ||  ||  ||  || 
|}

d~r, b~w, we~o, p~f are all common sound correspondences.

Ethnologue (2009, 2013) takes this a step further, and placed Yawa within West Papuan itself.

Foley (2018) classifies Yawa separately as an independent language family.

Typological overview
Yawa languages are split intransitive languages, which are typologically highly uncommon in New Guinea.

Unlike the Sepik languages, Taiap, and other languages of northern New Guinea, masculine rather than feminine is the unmarked gender, whereas Taiap and the Sepik languages treat feminine as the default unmarked gender. In Yawa languages, feminine is delegated mostly for animate nouns with obvious female sexual characteristics.

Basic vocabulary
Basic vocabulary of the Yapen languages Yawa and Saweru listed in Foley (2018):

{| 
|+ Yapen family basic vocabulary
! gloss !! Yawa !! Saweru
|-
| 'bird' ||  || 
|-
| 'blood' ||  || 
|-
| 'bone' ||  || 
|-
| 'breast' ||  || 
|-
| 'ear' ||  || 
|-
| 'eat' ||  || 
|-
| 'egg' ||  || 
|-
| 'eye' ||  || 
|-
| 'fire' ||  || 
|-
| 'go' ||  || 
|-
| 'ground' ||  || 
|-
| 'hair' ||  || 
|-
| 'hear' ||  || 
|-
| 'leg' ||  || 
|-
| 'louse' ||  || 
|-
| 'man' ||  || 
|-
| 'moon' ||  || 
|-
| 'name' ||  || 
|-
| 'one' ||  || 
|-
| 'path, road' ||  || 
|-
| 'see' ||  || 
|-
| 'stone' ||  || 
|-
| 'sun' ||  || 
|-
| 'tongue' ||  || 
|-
| 'tooth' ||  || 
|-
| 'tree' ||  || 
|-
| 'two' || ,  || 
|-
| 'water' ||  || 
|-
| 'woman' ||  || 
|}

The following basic vocabulary words are from Voorhoeve (1975), as cited in the Trans-New Guinea database:

{| class="wikitable sortable"
! gloss !! Yawa
|-
| head
| 
|-
| hair
| 
|-
| eye
| 
|-
| tooth
| 
|-
| leg
| 
|-
| louse
| 
|-
| dog
| 
|-
| pig
| 
|-
| bird
| 
|-
| egg
| 
|-
| blood
| 
|-
| bone
| 
|-
| skin
| 
|-
| tree
| 
|-
| man
| 
|-
| sun
| 
|-
| water
|  (?)
|-
| fire
| 
|-
| stone
| 
|-
| name
| 
|-
| eat
| 
|-
| one
| 
|-
| two
| 
|}

References

Further reading
Gasser, Emily. 2017. Papuan-Austronesian Language Contact on Yapen Island: A Preliminary Account. NUSA: Linguistic studies of languages in and around Indonesia, no.62, p. 101-155. 

 
West Papuan languages
Languages of western New Guinea
Papua (province) culture
Language families